is a Japanese actor associated with Grand-Arts. He debuted as an actor in 2005 as Shusuke Fuji in Musical: The Prince of Tennis and also reprised his role in the live-action film The Prince of Tennis. Since then, he has appeared in other theater productions, television programs, and films, such as Ryunosuke Ikenami/Shinken Blue in Samurai Sentai Shinkenger.

Filmography 
{| class="wikitable"
|-
!Year
!Film/television
!Role
!Other notes
|-
| 2004 || Occult Tantei-dan Shiningyou no Hakaba || Takashi Hara || Movie
|-
|rowspan="2"| 2006
| Ie Kaidan
| Hiroyuki Izawa
| Movie, Volume 3 of the Kaidan series
|-
| The Prince of Tennis
| Shusuke Fuji
| Movie
|-
|rowspan="3"| 2007
| Sukitomo
| Yoshiki Saitō
| Movie
|-
| Delicious Gakuin
| Rin Takasugi
| TV drama
|-
| Takumi-kun Series: Soshite Harukaze ni Sasayaite
| Sachi Inoue
| Movie
|-
|rowspan="8"| 2008 
| Uramiya Honpo Special 
| Yūya Ōkubo
| TV drama
|-
| Tadashii Ouji no Tsukuri Kata 
| Shurinosuke Hata 
| TV drama
|-
| Shiori to Shimiko no Kaiki Jikenbo"
| Ken Kurokawa
| TV drama, Episode 7
|-
| Cafe Daikanyama: Sweet Boys 
| Hibiki Shibata 
| Movie
|-
| Wild Strawberry| Chiaki
| TV drama
|-
| Teddy bear| Ryū
| Mobile drama
|-
| Bokura no Hōteishiki 
| Tomio Katō
| Movie
|-
| Cafe Daikanyama II: Yume no Tsuzuki 
| Hibiki Shibata 
| Movie
|-
|rowspan="5"| 2009 
| Kasabata Hime| Kōichi Akikawa 
| Movie
|-
| Samurai Sentai Shinkenger 
| Ryunosuke Ikenami/Shinken Blue
| TV drama, the 33rd Super Sentai series
|-
| Cafe Daikanyama III: Sorezore no Ashita 
| Hibiki Shibata 
| Movie
|-
| Kamen Rider Decade| Ryunosuke Ikenami/Shinken Blue
| TV drama, Episodes 24 and 25
|-
| Samurai Sentai Shinkenger the Movie: The Fateful War| Ryunosuke Ikenami/Shinken Blue
| Movie
|-
|rowspan="2"| 2010
| Samurai Sentai Shinkenger vs. Go-onger: GinmakuBang!!| Ryunosuke Ikenami/Shinken Blue
| Movie
|-
| Samurai Sentai Shinkenger Returns| Ryunosuke Ikenami/Shinken Blue
| Movie
|-
|rowspan="3"| 2011
| Tensou Sentai Goseiger vs. Shinkenger: Epic on Ginmaku| Ryunosuke Ikenami/Shinken Blue
| Movie
|-
| Hi wa Mata Noboru| Akira Nakasendō
| TV drama
|-
| Kaitō Royale| Keisuke Kurata
| TV drama
|-
|rowspan="5"| 2012
| Saiko no Jinsei| Hiura
| TV drama, Episode 5 
|-
| Equal Sweets ~Okashi na Kankei| Sōya
| Smartphone movie
|-
| The Boy Inside| Tomonari 
| Movie
|-
| Equal Sweets ~Okashi na Kankei| Sōya
| Smartphone movie
|-
| Aibō| Taishi Sakaki
| TV drama, Episodes 9 and 10 of season 11
|-
|rowspan="2"| 2013
| 35-sai no Koukousei| Ryuichiro Kitajima
| TV drama
|-
| Take Five ~Ore-tachi wa Ai o Nusumeru ka~| Araki
| TV drama, Episodes 5 and 6
|-
|rowspan="3"| 2014
| Ushijima the Loan Shark 2| Taisei Kizaki
| Movie
|-
| Kurofuku Monogatari| Kaoru Kasugai
| TV drama
|-
| Zenmō no Boku ga Bengoshi ni Natta Riyū| Shinpei Matsuda
| TV drama
|}

Variety shows:Sengoku Nabe TV ~Nantonaku Rekishi ga Manaberu Eizō~ SHICHIHON Yari as Fukushima Masanori
 Tenshou Kenou Shounen Shitetsu as Mancio Ito
 Bei'Z as Takenaka Hanbei
 Amakusa Shirō to Shimabara DE Midaretai as Amakusa Shirō

 Voice acting 
 Anime 
 The New Prince of Tennis (2012-present) - Kanata Irie
 Video games 
 Disney: Twisted-Wonderland (2020-present) - Vil Schoenheit 

 Dubbing 
 S.W.A.T.'' (2018) - Officer III James "Jim" Street (Alex Russell)

Awards 
Then 16th Junon Boy Judge's Special Award (3rd Place)

References

External links 
Official blog 
Official agency profile 

1987 births
Living people
Voice actors from Funabashi
Male voice actors from Chiba Prefecture
Japanese male film actors
Japanese male television actors
Japanese male musical theatre actors
Japanese male video game actors
Japanese male voice actors